The National Advisory Committee on the Sex Trafficking of Children & Youth in the United States is a U.S. federal government committee created by the Preventing Sex Trafficking and Strengthening Families Act.

The committee advises on policies concerning improvements to the United States' response to the sex trafficking of children and youth.

References

External links 

 

Commission on International Religious Freedom
Human trafficking in the United States